Mauricio Eduardo Lagos González (born 5 April 1984) is a Chilean footballer. 

He played for Deportes Concepción.

References
 
 

1984 births
Living people
Chilean footballers
Primera B de Chile players
Chilean Primera División players
C.D. Arturo Fernández Vial footballers
Deportes Concepción (Chile) footballers
Naval de Talcahuano footballers
Association football midfielders
People from Talcahuano